For most of the Cold War the United States Department of Energy Nuclear Weapons Transport Train, known as the White Train, transported nuclear weapons from the plant where they were constructed.  From 1951 to 1987 The Department of Energy's Office of Secure Transportation (OST) used the train to move the weapons by rail from the Pantex plant in the Texas panhandle. The train - which was armored and carried an array of defensive armament -  became the focus for peace and anti-nuclear weapon activism in the west. While the train's color was changed numerous times to avoid notice, it continued to be referred to by its original color.  After the last attempt to prosecute protesters who blocked the passage of the train failed, the Department of Energy began instead to move nuclear weapons by truck without public notice. Some of the White Train cars are preserved at the Amarillo Railroad Museum, while a few others are preserved at the Pantex Plant.

See also
Plowshares Movement
Naval Base Kitsap
List of armoured trains

References

Anti–nuclear weapons movement
Nuclear weapons infrastructure of the United States
Rail transportation in the United States
Texas railroads